The following are the association football (soccer) events of the year 1968 throughout the world.

Events
Copa Libertadores 1968: Won by Estudiantes de La Plata after defeating Palmeiras on an aggregate score of 2–0.
29 May – European Cup won by Manchester United after defeating Benfica 4–1 in extra time at Wembley Stadium, London.
 30 May – The Dutch national team plays its 300th official match in history, drawing 0–0 in a friendly against Scotland.
5 June – Alan Mullery becomes the first England player to be sent off in an international match during a 0–1 defeat to Yugoslavia in the European Nations' Cup semi-finals in Florence, Italy.
 19 September – Dutch club ADO makes its European debut by defeating Grazer AK (4–1) in the first round of the Cup Winners Cup, with four goals from Piet Giesen.

Winners club national championship

Asia
 : Al-Oruba

Europe
 : Manchester City
 : AS Saint-Étienne
 : KR
 : A.C. Milan
 : Ajax Amsterdam
 : Ruch Chorzów
 : Celtic
 : Real Madrid
 : Fenerbahçe
 : 1. FC Nürnberg

North America
: Toluca
 / 
 Atlanta Chiefs (NASL)

South America
 
 San Lorenzo - Metropolitano
 Vélez Sársfield - Nacional
 
 Botafogo - Taça Brasil
 Santos - Torneio Roberto Gomes Pedrosa
 : Olimpia Asunción

International tournaments
 African Cup of Nations in Ethiopia (12–21 January 1968)
 
 
 
1968 British Home Championship (21 October 1967 – 28 February 1968)

 UEFA European Football Championship in Italy (5–10 June 1968)
 
 
 
Olympic Games in Mexico City, Mexico (13–26 October 1968)

Births

 1 January – Davor Šuker, Croatian international footballer
 31 March –  Francesco Moriero, Italian international footballer and manager
 1 April – Bulat Esmagambetov, Kazakhstani footballer
 16 April – Martin Dahlin, Swedish international footballer
 18 April – Adelio Salinas, former Paraguayan footballer
 1 May – Oliver Bierhoff, German international footballer
 2 May – Pedro Ramos, Ecuadorian football referee
 22 May – Gabriel Mendoza, Chilean international footballer
 5 June – Percy Olivares, Peruvian footballer
 6 June – Edwin Vurens, Dutch footballer
 22 June – Fabián Guevara, Chilean footballer
 25 June – Dorinel Munteanu, Romanian international footballer
 26 June – Paolo Maldini, Italian international footballer
 14 August – Onésimo Sánchez, Spanish football player and manager
 15 August – Ulugbek Ruzimov, Uzbekistani footballer
 20 August – Klas Ingesson, Swedish international footballer and manager (died 2014)
 11 September – Slaven Bilić, Croatian international football player and manager
 14 September – Jorge Gómez, Chilean footballer
 15 September – Juan Carlos Garay, Ecuadorian footballer
 17 September – Francesc Vilanova, Spanish footballer and manager (died 2014)
 18 September – Carlos Guirland, Paraguayan footballer
 8 October – Zvonimir Boban, Croatian international footballer
 17 October – Héctor Ferri, Ecuadorian footballer
 20 October – Jonathan Akpoborie, Nigerian international footballer
 24 October – Osmar Donizete Cândido, Brazilian international footballer
 18 November – Barry Hunter, Northern Irish international and scout
 13 December – Carlos Hasselbaink, Dutch footballer
 26 December – Thijs Waterink, Dutch footballer

Deaths

January
 4 January – Armando Castellazzi, Italian midfielder, winner of the 1934 FIFA World Cup and first man to win the Serie A both as player and as manager. (63)

June
 17 June – José Nasazzi, Uruguayan defender, winner of the 1930 FIFA World Cup and by many regarded as Uruguay's greatest ever player. (67)

August
 30 August - Luitpold Popp, German international footballer (born 1893)

November
 10 November – Santos Iriarte, Uruguayan forward, winner of the 1930 FIFA World Cup. (66)

December
 21 December – Vittorio Pozzo, Italian manager, winner of the 1934 FIFA World Cup and 1938 FIFA World Cup and the only manager that won the FIFA World Cup twice. (82)
 28 December – Fernando Giudicelli, Brazilian midfielder, Brazilian squad member the 1930 FIFA World Cup. (62)

References

 
Association football by year